is a Japanese politician of the Liberal Democratic Party (LDP), a member of the House of Representatives in the Diet (national legislature). A native of Onga, Fukuoka, he attended Hitotsubashi University and Dag Hammarskjöld College in the United States, and received a master's degree from Carleton University in Canada. He was elected to the House of Representatives for the first time in 1986. He participated in the formation of the New Party Sakigake in 1993 but later returned to the LDP. He was defeated in the 2009 election by DPJ candidate Rintaro Ogata.

Representative Mihara was re-elected in 2012 to the Fukuoka Prefectural 9th district.  He is a member of the Party Ethics and Fundamental National Policies Committees as well as the Director of the Special Committee on Promotion of Science and Technology, and Innovation.

In 2004, Mihara received political donations of ¥ 300,000 from organizations related to the Unification Church.

Mihara is a member of the Diet groups of Nippon Kaigi, an openly revisionist lobby, and Shintō Seiji Renmei, a fundamentalist Shintō lobby.

References

External links
 Official website (in Japanese)

1947 births
Living people
Politicians from Fukuoka Prefecture
Hitotsubashi University alumni
Carleton University alumni
Members of Nippon Kaigi
Members of the House of Representatives (Japan)
New Party Sakigake politicians
Liberal Democratic Party (Japan) politicians
21st-century Japanese politicians